Phipps Turnbull was a Scottish international rugby union player.

He was capped for  six times between 1901 and 1902. He also played for Edinburgh Academicals RFC.

His half-brother Gerard Crole was also capped for Scotland, and played for the Scotland national cricket team.

References
 Bath, Richard (ed.) The Scotland Rugby Miscellany (Vision Sports Publishing Ltd, 2007 )

Scottish rugby union players
Scotland international rugby union players
Edinburgh Academicals rugby union players
Year of birth missing
Year of death missing